Vladimir Sekulovski (born October 7, 1980 in Tetovo) is a Macedonian footballer who plays as a defender for Macedonian Third Football League club FK Osogovo.

Club career
He previously played in the Albanian Superliga for Shkumbini Peqin. Internationally, he represented his country at under-18 level, and was an unused substitute for the senior team as they beat Liechtenstein 3–1 in a Euro 2004 qualifier.

References

1980 births
Living people
Sportspeople from Tetovo
Association football defenders
Macedonian footballers
North Macedonia youth international footballers
FK Sloga Jugomagnat players
FK Vardar players
FK Rabotnički players
KS Shkumbini Peqin players
FK Teteks players
FK Makedonija Gjorče Petrov players
FK Osogovo players
Macedonian First Football League players
Kategoria Superiore players
Macedonian Second Football League players
Macedonian expatriate footballers
Expatriate footballers in Albania
Macedonian expatriate sportspeople in Albania